The High Adventure Cliffhangers Buck Rogers Adventure Game was a role-playing game published by TSR in 1993.

Publication
Following lackluster response to the Buck Rogers Battle for the XXVth Century board game (1988), TSR decided to try again with a more conventional table-top RPG, this time based on the original 1928 Philip Francis Nowlan novel Armageddon, 2419 A.D. (Ace, Aug 1978) and subsequent 1929 comic strip continuity, in which resurgent tribal Americans overthrow their Red Mongol conquerors. The basic game was called the High Adventure Cliffhangers Buck Rogers Adventure Game (Sep 1993) and was co-designed by Jeff Grubb and Steven Schend. The High Adventure Cliffhangers Buck Rogers War Against The Han Campaign Supplement (Dec 1993) was designed by Steven Schend alone.

This new Buck Rogers role-playing game was a return to the themes of the original Buck Rogers comic strips. This game included biplanes and interracial warfare, as opposed to the space combat of the earlier Buck Rogers XXVC game. There were only a few expansion modules created for High-Adventure Cliffhangers. Shortly afterward, the game was discontinued, and the production of Buck Rogers RPGs and games came to an end. This game was neither widely advertised nor very popular. There were only two published products: the box set, and "War Against the Han".

Reception

Reviews
Dosdediez (Número 5 - Jul/Ago 1994)

References

Buck Rogers
Role-playing games based on comics
Role-playing games introduced in 1993
Space opera role-playing games
TSR, Inc. games